Frederik Albert "Frits" Palm (born 1947 - died 2011) was a Dutch economist, civil servant and former politician for the Pim Fortuyn List in the House of Representatives from 2002 to 2003.

Before he was elected to parliament, Palm was the director of the Cabinet of Antillean Affairs. In parliament he focused on Foreign Affairs, European Affairs, Defense and Kingdom Relations. Palm was also second vice-president of the House of Representatives.

References 

1947 births
2011 deaths
Members of the House of Representatives (Netherlands)
Pim Fortuyn List politicians
21st-century Dutch politicians